The Philippine Law School (PLS), founded in 1915, is a law school in the Philippines. It formerly served as the college of law of National University.

It has produced lawyers such as Philippine President Carlos P. Garcia, a member of the class of 1923 who placed 8th in the Bar Examinations with a rating of 86.60%. President Diosdado Macapagal was also a PLS law student until his sophomore year, later transferring to the University of Santo Tomas. The school also produced Senate President Neptali A. Gonzales, and Atty. Anacleto R. Mangaser, who holds the third highest official general average in the history of the Bar Examinations (95.85%).

History
Founded in 1915 by Attys. Simeon and Ricardo Conlu Lacson with a collaboration with Mariano F. Jhocson Sr., the founder of the National University (Philippines), Philippine Law School was established at its first campus in Quiapo, Manila. It previously served as the College of Law of National University (Philippines) in Sampaloc, Manila.
 
Atty. Simeon Rene T. Lacson took over as President and oversaw the school's transfer from Intramuros to Pasay in 1958. He served the school until his death in 2009.

Today, Philippine Law School's Board of Trustees is headed by Mr. Vittorio G. Lacson (Chairman), with Ms. Sabina G. Lacson (President/COO) in charge of operations, and Atty. Jose Grapilon as Dean.

Notable alumni

 Carlos P. Garcia - 8th President of the Philippines, lawyer, teacher and poet. Bachelor of Laws (Philippine Law School), Doctor of Humanities (honoris causa) National University (1961).
 Diosdado Macapagal - 9th President of the Philippines, 6th Vice President of the Philippines, lawyer and professor. Bachelor of Laws (attended).
 Neptali Gonzales - President of the Senate of the Philippines from 1992 to 1993, 1995 to 1996, and 1998, lawyer. Top 9 in 1949 Philippine Bar Examination.
 Cornelio Villareal - Speaker of the House of Representatives of the Philippines from 1962 to 1967, and from 1971 to 1972
 Josepha Abiertas - was the first woman to graduate from the school
 Ramon Bagatsing - was Mayor of Manila from 1971 to 1986
 Alberto Segismundo Cruz - poet, short story writer and novelist
 Manuel S. Enverga - founder of Manuel S. Enverga University Foundation
 Jose Garvida Flores - poet and playwright
 León María Guerrero III - was ambassador to the United Kingdom (1954 to 1962), Spain (1962 to 1966), India (1966 to 1973), Mexico (1973 to 1977) and Yugoslavia (1977 to 1980)
 Antonio Horrilleno - was an associate justice of the Supreme Court of the Philippines
 Santiago Lucero - was a member of the 3rd Congress of the Republic for Cebu's 6th District from 1954 to 1956
 Felixberto Serrano - was Secretary of Foreign Affairs under President Carlos P. Garcia from 1957 to 1961
 Jose B. Lingad - provincial governor of Pampanga from 1948 to 1951 and congressman from Pampanga from 1969 to 1972.

References

External links
 

National University (Philippines)
Educational institutions established in 1915
Graduate schools in the Philippines
Law schools in the Philippines
1915 establishments in the Philippines